Jolanda di Savoia is a comune (municipality) in the Province of Ferrara in the Italian region Emilia-Romagna, located about  northeast of Bologna and about  east of Ferrara. Founded as Le Venezie in 1903, it took its current name (from that of Princess Yolanda of Savoy) in 1911.

Jolanda di Savoia borders the following municipalities: Berra, Codigoro, Copparo, Fiscaglia, Formignana, Tresigallo.

References

External links

 Official website

Cities and towns in Emilia-Romagna
Populated places established in 1903
1903 establishments in Italy